The Lyon Park Historic District is a national historic district and upper-class neighborhood located at Arlington County, Virginia. It contains 1,165 contributing buildings and 1 contributing site in a residential neighborhood in North Arlington. The area was platted between 1919 and 1951. The dwelling styles include a variety of architectural styles, ranging from Craftsman-style bungalows dating from the 1920s to Colonial Revival-style buildings dating from the 1930s and 1940s. A number of Queen Anne style dwellings erected prior to the platting of Lyon Park are also present. It was developed by Frank Lyon.

It was listed on the National Register of Historic Places in 2003.

Footnotes

Houses on the National Register of Historic Places in Virginia
Queen Anne architecture in Virginia
Colonial Revival architecture in Virginia
Historic districts in Arlington County, Virginia
National Register of Historic Places in Arlington County, Virginia
Houses in Arlington County, Virginia
Historic districts on the National Register of Historic Places in Virginia